I Never Said I Was an Angel is a 2009 album by Pauline Kamusewu.

Track listing
I Never Said I Was an Angel
If You Don't Know Me
Red Carpet
Give Me a Call
Dancin
The Misconception
Happy People
Sunshine Boulevard
Loving You
It's OK
Running Out of Gaz
Don't Leave

Charts

References

2009 albums
Pauline Kamusewu albums